The Green Lake County Courthouse in Green Lake, Wisconsin, United States, is the former seat of government for Green Lake County.  The county government relocated to a new facility in 2011, and the following year the former courthouse underwent adaptive reuse as the Town Square Community Center.  The courthouse was built in 1899 at a cost of $25,000. Among its features is a pedimented portico. It was listed on the National Register of Historic Places in 1982 and the State Register of Historic Places in 1989.

References

External links

 Town Square Community Center

Brick buildings and structures
Courthouses on the National Register of Historic Places in Wisconsin
Government buildings completed in 1899
National Register of Historic Places in Green Lake County, Wisconsin
Neoclassical architecture in Wisconsin
Former courthouses in the United States